Hypolycaena auricostalis is a butterfly in the family Lycaenidae. It is found in the Democratic Republic of the Congo, Tanzania, Zambia and Malawi.

Subspecies
Hypolycaena auricostalis auricostalis (Tanzania, Zambia, Malawi, Democratic Republic of the Congo: Lualaba and Shaba)
Hypolycaena auricostalis frommi Strand, 1911 (Tanzania)

References

Die Gross-Schmetterlinge der Erde 13: Die Afrikanischen Tagfalter. Plate XIII 68 b
Die Gross-Schmetterlinge der Erde 13: Die Afrikanischen Tagfalter. Plate XIII 68 c ssp. frommi Strand, 1911

Butterflies described in 1897
Hypolycaenini
Butterflies of Africa
Taxa named by Arthur Gardiner Butler